The Newmarket Saints were a minor league hockey team in Newmarket, Ontario. It played in the American Hockey League from 1986 to 1991 as the farm team of the Toronto Maple Leafs at the Ray Twinney Complex.

After the 1985–86 season, the Toronto Maple Leafs moved their top affiliate from St. Catharines to the Ray Twinney Complex, a recently built arena in Newmarket, north of Toronto.

However, the Ray Twinney Complex was nowhere near adequate for an AHL team, and Newmarket itself was too small at the time for the team to be viable.  These factors, combined with the team being barely competitive (only one winning season), led the Leafs to move the Saints to St. John's, Newfoundland and Labrador for the 1991–92 season where they became the St. John's Maple Leafs. The void in Newmarket would be filled by the Newmarket Royals, of the OHL.

The franchise was replaced by:
 OHL Newmarket Royals (1991–1994) - moved from Cornwall, now Sarnia Sting
 OHA Junior A Newmarket Hurricanes

Alumni
Former players include:
Tim Bernhardt
Allan Bester
Tie Domi
John Kordic
Garry Lariviere
Bob McGill
Chris McRae
Barry Melrose
Jim Ralph
Jeff Reese

Season-by-season results

Regular season

Playoffs

Team records

Single Season
Goals: Marty Dallman 50
Assists: Daniel Reame 63
Points: Daniel Reame 110
Penalty Minutes: Tie Domi 187
GAA: Allan Bester 2.87
SV%: Serafin Fernandez .927

Career
Career Goals:
Career Assists:
Career Points:
Career Penalty Minutes:
Career Goaltending Wins:
Career Shutouts:
Career Games:

See also
List of ice hockey teams in Ontario

 
Toronto Maple Leafs minor league affiliates
Maple Leaf Sports & Entertainment
Ice hockey clubs established in 1986
Sports clubs disestablished in 1991
1986 establishments in Ontario
1991 disestablishments in Ontario